Roy Rohan Richards (24 November 1983 – 8 July 2017) was a footballer who played for the Saint Vincent and the Grenadines national football team.

Club career
Richards played club football for Tobago United, Pastures United and Rendezvous.

International career
Richards made his international debut against Jamaica in June 2008. His first and only international goal was against British Virgin Islands in a 6–0 victory in September 2014. His final game was against United States in a 2018 FIFA World Cup qualifying game during September 2016.

Death
Richards was shot at a shop in Barrouallie on 8 July 2017. He was taken to a Kingstown hospital, where he later died.

References

1983 births
2017 deaths
Saint Vincent and the Grenadines footballers
Saint Vincent and the Grenadines international footballers
Tobago United F.C. players
Pastures F.C. players
Rendezvous FC players
Association football defenders
Saint Vincent and the Grenadines expatriate footballers
Saint Vincent and the Grenadines expatriate sportspeople in Trinidad and Tobago
Expatriate footballers in Trinidad and Tobago
Saint Vincent and the Grenadines expatriate sportspeople in Barbados
Expatriate footballers in Barbados
Deaths by firearm in Saint Vincent and the Grenadines
People from Saint Patrick Parish, Saint Vincent and the Grenadines
People murdered in Saint Vincent and the Grenadines
Male murder victims